Down to the Sea is a 1936 American drama film directed by Lewis D. Collins and written by Robert Lee Johnson and Wellyn Totman. The film stars Russell Hardie, Ben Lyon, Ann Rutherford, Irving Pichel, Fritz Leiber and Vince Barnett. The film was released on May 30, 1936, by Republic Pictures.

Plot

Cast 
Russell Hardie as John Kaminas
Ben Lyon as Steve Londos
Ann Rutherford as Helen Pappas
Irving Pichel as Alex Fotakis
Fritz Leiber as Gregory Pappas
Vince Barnett as Hector
Maurice Murphy as Luis
Nigel De Brulier as Demetrius
Paul Porcasi as Vasilios
Victor Potel as Andy
Karl Hackett as Joe
Francisco Marán as George
Frank Yaconelli as Pete
Mike Tellegen as Cimos
John Picorri as Greek Proprietor

References

External links
 

1936 films
1930s English-language films
American drama films
1936 drama films
Republic Pictures films
Films directed by Lewis D. Collins
American black-and-white films
Films featuring underwater diving
Sponge diving
Films set in Florida
Films produced by Nat Levine
1930s American films